Raine Nuutinen (8 June 1931 – 5 August 2012) was a Finnish basketball player. He competed in the men's tournament at the 1952 Summer Olympics.

References

1931 births
2012 deaths
Finnish men's basketball players
Olympic basketball players of Finland
Basketball players at the 1952 Summer Olympics
Sportspeople from Helsinki